Pope Marcellus may refer to two Roman Catholic popes:
Pope Marcellus I (reigned 308–309)
Pope Marcellus II (reigned 1555)

Marcellus